The 2015 Niger State gubernatorial election was the 8th gubernatorial election of Niger State. Held on April 11, 2015, the All Progressives Congress nominee Abubakar Sani Bello won the election, defeating Umar Nasko of the People's Democratic Party.

APC primary
APC candidate, Abubakar Sani Bello clinched the party ticket. The APC primary election was held in 2014.

PDP primary
PDP candidate, Umar Nasko clinched the party ticket. The PDP primary election was held in 2014.

Results 
A total of 10 candidates contested in the election. Abubakar Sani Bello from the All Progressives Congress won the election, defeating Umar Nasko from the People's Democratic Party. The winner, Abubakar Sani Bello won in 23 out of 25 Local Government Areas in the State, Umar Nasko won just 2 Local Government Areas.

References 

Niger State gubernatorial elections
Niger gubernatorial